In 1998, ViK. Recordings was established as a Canadian record label  shortly after Lisa Zbitnew became president of the Canadian arm of BMG, which was then the owner of RCA Records. Its notable artists included: McMaster & James, Tom Green, Treble Charger, Jacksoul, Shawn Desman, Rascalz and Keshia Chanté. Most of its roster were absorbed into Sony BMG Music Canada, following the merger of Sony and BMG in 2004 and the appointment of Lisa Zbitnew to President and CEO of Sony BMG Music Canada the same year.

See also
 List of record labels

Defunct record labels of Canada
Record labels established in 1998
Record labels disestablished in 2004